The 1992–93 Washington State Cougars men's basketball team represented Washington State University for the 1992–93 NCAA Division I men's basketball season. Led by sixth-year head coach Kelvin Sampson, the Cougars were members of the Pacific-10 Conference and played their home games on campus at Beasley Coliseum in Pullman, Washington.

References

External links
Sports Reference – Washington State Cougars: 1992–93 basketball season

Washington State Cougars men's basketball seasons
Washington State Cougars
Washington State
Washington State